Fanny Vágó (born 23 July 1991) is a Hungarian football striker, currently playing for Ferencváros of the Női NB I.

She has played for MTK Hungária FC in Hungary's Noi NB I also in Germany's Regionalliga for TSV Crailsheim, Iceland's Úrvalsdeild for Throttur and in Romania's Liga I for CFF Olimpia Cluj.

She is a member of the Hungarian national team.

International goals

References

External links

 Profile at FSK St. Pölten-Spratzern 

1991 births
Living people
Hungarian women's footballers
1. FC Femina players
MTK Hungária FC (women) players
Expatriate women's footballers in Germany
Expatriate women's footballers in Iceland
Hungarian expatriate sportspeople in Germany
Hungarian expatriate sportspeople in Iceland
Hungarian expatriate sportspeople in Austria
Hungarian expatriate sportspeople in Romania
Sportspeople from Szeged
Women's association football forwards
Expatriate women's footballers in Austria
Expatriate women's footballers in Romania
FSK St. Pölten-Spratzern players
Ferencvárosi TC (women) footballers
Hungary women's international footballers
ÖFB-Frauenliga players
FCU Olimpia Cluj players
FIFA Century Club